Felipe Almeida Félix (born 20 April 1985), known as Félix, is a Brazilian former footballer.

Football career
Born in Itanhaém, São Paulo, Felix finished his formation with Clube Atlético Paranaense. He would only play amateur football in his country during his career, which started in Portugal with GD Os Nazarenos.

In 2008, Félix joined Russian Premier League club PFC Spartak Nalchik. He failed to score during his two-year tenure, also being loaned to Baku FC and Rio Branco Esporte Clube.

In June 2010, Spartak declared that they had no intention to reinstate Félix in the squad, but expected to receive a fee from the Brazilian side that was vying for his services. However, he eventually returned to Portugal and joined Leixões S.C. in the Segunda Liga. He scored his first goal as a professional at nearly 26 years of age, contributing to a 3–3 away draw against S.C. Freamunde.

Félix competed in Hungary, Brazil and Japan in the following years, playing top flight football with Ferencvárosi TC. In 2014, he switched to the China League One with Beijing Baxy FC, joining fellow league team Xinjiang Tianshan Leopard F.C. the following year.

In April 2018 after a 3-year absence from the professional game, Félix earned himself an opportunity to sign for Japanese side Giravanz Kitakyushu in the J3 League.

References

External links

1985 births
Living people
Footballers from São Paulo (state)
Brazilian footballers
Association football forwards
Club Athletico Paranaense players
Rio Branco Esporte Clube players
Associação Atlética Caldense players
Esporte Clube Novo Hamburgo players
Liga Portugal 2 players
Segunda Divisão players
FC Pampilhosa players
S.C.U. Torreense players
Odivelas F.C. players
Leixões S.C. players
Russian Premier League players
PFC Spartak Nalchik players
Azerbaijan Premier League players
FC Baku players
Nemzeti Bajnokság I players
Ferencvárosi TC footballers
J2 League players
Saudi First Division League players
Hokkaido Consadole Sapporo players
Kyoto Sanga FC players
China League One players
Beijing Sport University F.C. players
Xinjiang Tianshan Leopard F.C. players
Al-Orobah FC players
Brazilian expatriate footballers
Expatriate footballers in Portugal
Expatriate footballers in Russia
Expatriate footballers in Azerbaijan
Expatriate footballers in Hungary
Expatriate footballers in Japan
Expatriate footballers in China
Expatriate footballers in Saudi Arabia
Brazilian expatriate sportspeople in Portugal
Brazilian expatriate sportspeople in Russia
Brazilian expatriate sportspeople in Azerbaijan
Brazilian expatriate sportspeople in Hungary
Brazilian expatriate sportspeople in Japan
Brazilian expatriate sportspeople in China
Brazilian expatriate sportspeople in Saudi Arabia
People from Itanhaém